Sam Greenwood (born 26 January 2002) is an English footballer who plays as a midfielder or forward for  club Leeds United.

Early life
Greenwood was born in Sunderland.

Club career
Greenwood started his career at Hebburn Town Juniors and Sunderland's academy, but left to join Arsenal's academy in 2018 at the age of 16, for a fee reported to be £500,000.

Greenwood joined Leeds United on a three-year deal on 28 August 2020 for an undisclosed fee, reported to be £1,500,000. He won the Premier League 2 player of the month award for September 2020. Greenwood made his senior Leeds debut on 10 January 2021 in the 3–0 FA Cup third round defeat against Crawley Town as a second-half substitute.

His second senior appearance for the club was in Leeds' 2-0 EFL Cup defeat at Arsenal on 26 October 2021, where he came on as a 70th minute replacement for Rodrigo. He made his Premier League debut on 18 December 2021 as a substitute in a 4–1 defeat at Arsenal. He was given his first Premier League start in the final match of the season away to Brentford on 22 May 2022, with Leeds needing to better Burnley's result to avoid relegation. Leeds won 2–1, with Greenwood playing as a central midfielder, and Burnley lost 2–1, ensuring Leeds' Premier League survival. In total, he made nine appearances across the 2021–22 season.

Greenwood’s first Premier League goal came in Leeds’ 4-3 win over Bournemouth at Elland Road on 5 November 2022.

International career
Greenwood has represented England at under-17, under-18 and under-19 levels.

On 6 September 2021, Greenwood made his debut for the England U20s during a 6–1 victory over Romania U20s at St. George's Park.

On 16 November 2021, Greenwood made a goalscoring debut for the England U21s as a 36th-minute substitute during the 3–2 defeat to Georgia in Batumi.

Career statistics

References

External links
 

2002 births
Living people
English footballers
Footballers from Sunderland
Association football forwards
Leeds United F.C. players
Premier League players
England under-21 international footballers